In the United States, the start school later movement is an interdisciplinary effort by health professionals, sleep researchers, educators, community advocates, parents, students, and other concerned citizens working for school hours that give students an opportunity to get enough sleep at optimal times. It bases its claims on a growing body of evidence that starting middle and high schools too early in the morning is unhealthy, counterproductive, and incompatible with adolescent sleep needs and patterns. During the second half of the 20th century, many public schools in the United States began shifting instructional time earlier than the more conventional bell time, thoughtout 9 a.m. Today it is common for American schools to begin the instructional day in the 7 a.m. hour and end about seven hours later, around 2 p.m. Most sleep research suggests that morning classes should begin no earlier than 8:30 a.m. for middle and high school students.

Advocates of a return to later school start times argue that sleep and school hours should be viewed as a public health issue, citing evidence linking early school start times to widespread sleep deprivation among teenagers as well as a wide array of acute and chronic physical, psychological, and educational problems. Not only do students consistently get significantly more sleep on school nights when their schools move to later start times, but later school hours have been consistently linked with improved school performance, reduced impulsiveness, and greater motivation, as well as with lower rates of depression, tardiness, truancy, and morning automobile accidents. Recent (2011) studies suggest that early school start times disproportionately hurt economically disadvantaged students and may even negatively impact future earning potential of students, offsetting any financial savings to the school system attributed to earlier hours.

History 
In the early 1990s, the University of Minnesota's landmark School Start Time Study tracked high school students from two Minneapolis-area districts – Edina, a suburban district that changed its opening hour from 7:20 a.m. to 8:30 a.m. and the Minneapolis Public Schools, which changed their opening from 7:20 a.m. to 8:40 a.m. Many positive benefits to students were found, including:
 Improved attendance and enrollment rates
 Less sleeping in class
 Less student-reported depression
 Fewer student visits to school counselors for behavioral and peer issues
 More even temperament at home

A longitudinal follow-up study of the Minneapolis Public Schools after five years revealed that these and other positive benefits had persisted. In 2014, a three-year project using data from more than 9,000 students attending eight high schools in three states, found that when schools switched to a start time of 8:30 a.m. or later, attendance, standardized test scores and academic performance improved, and tardiness, substance abuse, symptoms of depression, consumption of caffeinated drinks, and the rate of traffic accidents involving teen drivers decreased.

Since the 1990s over 250 individual schools or districts in 45 states have delayed their start times, and scores of others are considering a change at any given time. Despite sporadic reform efforts on the part of educators, public health officials, legislators, and grassroots groups, however, most American middle and high schools still require students to begin instruction prior to 8:30 a.m.  Failure of efforts to delay start times over the years has primarily been due to pushback from community members who fear that a shift to later school hours will be prohibitively expensive and/or disrupt after-school sports and other extracurricular schedules, student jobs, daycare arrangement, teacher training, or time for homework. Despite evidence of benefit to students, as of 2019 less than 20% of US high schools and middle schools start the school day at 8:30 am or later. In October 2019, the state of California passed a law (California Bill 328) mandating that middle schools begin the day no earlier than 8 am, and high schools no earlier than 8:30 am.

Shifted circadian rhythms and sleep deprivation 
Proponents of a return to later school hours cite abundant evidence that starting middle and high school before about 8:30 or 9 a.m. is incompatible with the biological clocks of teenagers and young adults. In 1993, a team led by Mary Carskadon, PhD, of Brown University showed that changes in circadian biology during puberty drive a "sleep-phase delay," a shift in the sleep-wake patterns of adolescents that leads them to fall asleep and wake up later than younger and older people. Subsequent studies have confirmed these findings, explored the impact of school start times on the sleep needs and patterns of adolescents., and demonstrated a "phase shift" in the release of melatonin at puberty, which appears to be involved in shifting the sleep-wake cycle several hours later during the adolescent years. This same shift to a delayed phase in the release of melatonin during puberty has also been seen in other mammals.

The shifted circadian rhythms associated with puberty make it difficult, if not impossible, for many teenagers—who may have to rise at 5 or 6 a.m. to get ready and commute to school in time for 7 a.m. school bells—to get sufficient sleep on school nights. Even discounting for the distractions of homework and extracurricular demands and electronics, most adolescents find it difficult to fall asleep before about 11 p.m. or rise before about 8 a.m. In addition, they need to sleep in until 8 a.m. or so to get the 9 or more hours of sleep that most sleep research suggests they need. As a result, many teenagers arrive at school sleep-deprived. The most recent data from the Youth Risk Behavior Survey show that 70% of American high school students are sleep-deprived and about 40% get six or fewer hours of sleep per night.

Health and safety impact of early school hours 

Later school starts are associated with increased sleep for students. Almost 70% of teens reportedly do not get enough sleep and there are reported increases in stimulant abuse, weight gain, risk of diabetes, immune disorders, mood swings, depression, and suicidal ideation, as well as reduced impulse control. Early school start times have been associated with drowsy driving in new teen drivers and higher car crash rates. Schools ending early in the afternoon may also increase the risk of engaging in unhealthy, risky behaviors among sleep-deprived adolescents. Sending children to school before sunrise may also mean they must wait or walk in dark, with low visibility.

Impact on school performance 

Sleep deprivation can result in low motivation, difficulty concentrating, restlessness, slowed reaction times, lack of energy, frequent errors, forgetfulness, and impaired decision-making skills. Studies, many spearheaded by Kyla Wahlstrom and her research team at University of Minnesota's Center for Applied Research and Educational Improvement (CAREI), have tied these effects to early school start times, which, in turn, have repeatedly been linked to increased rates of tardiness, truancy, absenteeism, and dropping out. In 2012 a study using data from Wake County, North Carolina, showed that delaying middle school start times by one hour, from roughly 7:30 to 8:30, increases standardized test scores by at least two percentile points in math and one percentile point in reading. The effect was largest for students with below-average test scores, suggesting that later start times would narrow gaps in student achievement.

Equity 

The impact of later start times on school performance—including reduced truancy, absenteeism, and increased overall academic achievement—is approximately double in economically disadvantaged students.  This discrepancy may be explained, at least in part, by the fact that privileged students have opportunities to attend private schools (most of which start instruction after 8 a.m.) and/or save time by driving or being driven to school.

Economic impact 

A 2017 report by the RAND Corporation concluded that delaying school start times to 8:30 a.m. is a cost-effective, population-level strategy that would significantly impact public health and the U.S. economy, with benefits quickly outweighing any immediate costs. After just two years, the study conservatively projected a gain of $8.6 billion to the U.S. economy. After a decade, this gain would increase to $83 billion, and after 15 years to $140 billion, amounting to an average annual gain to the U.S. economy of $9.3 billion. An earlier Hamilton Project Report published by the Brookings Institution concluded that starting class later can be an immediate and inexpensive way to boost health, safety, and achievement for all students. The authors, economists Brian A. Jacob and Jonah E. Rockoff, predicted that starting high schools one hour later, at about 9 a.m., would result in roughly $17,500 in increased future earnings per student in present value—a benefit:cost ratio of at least 9:1 even when changing schedules requires upfront investment to alter bus schedules and/or accommodate later after-school activities.

Calls for reform 
As early as 1993, sleep researchers and healthcare leaders began encouraging school administrators to move middle and high school hours to 8:30 a.m. or later.
In the past two decades, numerous health, educational, and civic leaders are calling for a return to later, healthier school start times, including former U.S. Education Secretary Arne Duncan, the National Sleep Foundation, and the National Institutes of Health. In 2014 the American Academy of Pediatrics issued a policy statement recommending that middle and high schools start no earlier than 8:30 a.m. as an effective means of addressing the serious public health issue of insufficient sleep in adolescents, a position echoed in 2015 by the Centers for Disease Control and Prevention and in 2016 by the American Medical Association, and supported by the American Academy of Child and Adolescent Psychiatry, the American Thoracic Society, the National Association of School Nurses, and the Society of Pediatric Nurses. The National Education Association issued a resolution supporting school schedules that follow research-based recommendations regarding the sleep patterns of age groups. Several state medical societies have issued position statements or resolutions supporting later school start times, as have both the Washington and Virginia state Parent Teachers Associations (PTAs) and the Seattle Educators Association. A move to a later school start time is also consistent with the Healthy People 2020 Objective to increase the proportion of students in grades 9 to 12 who get sufficient sleep.

California Congresswoman Zoe Lofgren has repeatedly introduced versions of a "ZZZ's to A's" Bill and Resolution to the U.S. Congress since 1998, all proposing limits on the hours at which American high schools can begin required instruction. As of the 116th Congress, all efforts to pass legislation have died in committee.

Numerous bills related to sleep and school start times have been introduced in state legislatures since the 1990s, including the California, Florida, Maryland, Virginia, Hawaii, Indiana, Tennessee, Minnesota, New Jersey, Maine, Pennsylvania, Rhode Island, South Carolina, Utah, Washington, Nevada, and Massachusetts legislatures. In 2014 Maryland was the first state to pass school start time legislation via HB 883, sponsored by Delegate Aruna Miller (D, Montgomery County) and passed unanimously by the Maryland General Assembly. This legislation required the state Department of Health and Mental Hygiene to conduct a study on student sleep needs, explore ways school systems can shift hours to accommodate them, and develop recommendations about whether state public schools should adopt a policy of start times at 8 a.m. or later, resulting in the "Report on Safe and Healthy School Hours". Two years later the Maryland state legislature passed the Orange Ribbon Bill for Healthy School Hours, also sponsored by Delegate Miller, a voluntary, no-cost, incentive program recognizing districts for implementing evidence-based school hours. In 2015 New Jersey passed a law (S2484) requiring the state Department of Education to study the options and benefits of starting school later at middle and high schools and recommend whether the state should establish a pilot program to test later school start times in select middle schools and high schools throughout the state.  A 2017 California bill introduced by Senator Anthony J. Portantino that would have prevented state middle and high schools from requiring attendance before 8:30 a.m. was passed by the state legislature in 2018 but vetoed by Governor Jerry Brown. The bill, slightly modified and reintroduced in 2019 and co-sponsored by Start School Later and the California State PTA, was passed by the legislature in September 2019 and signed into law by Governor Gavin Newsom, making California the first state in the nation to set a floor on how early schools can require attendance.

The Fairfax County (Virginia) Public Schools (FCPS) Board of Education passed a resolution in April 2012 affirming their goal to find ways to start county high schools after 8 a.m. to allow students to get sufficient sleep, a resolution supported by the Washington Post's editorial board. In June 2013 FCPS contracted a team from the Children’s National Medical Center's Division of Sleep Medicine to partner with Fairfax County students, parents, educators, administrators, and other community stakeholders to develop a plan to accomplish this task. This effort led the Washington Post's editorial board to endorse later school start times as a "smarter way to start high schoolers' days" in August 2013. This editorial was tweeted by U.S. Education Secretary Arne Duncan along with the comment that starting high school later and letting teens sleep more was a "common sense" way "to improve student achievement that too few have implemented." As new school superintendent Karen Garza laid out her vision for the district in September 2013, she vowed to push for later school start times. On October 1, 2013, Montgomery County, MD School Superintendent Joshua Starr recommended that high school start times be moved 50 minutes to 8:15 a.m., with a proposed start in the 2015–16 school year.

In England, Oxford's Sleep and Circadian Neurosciences Institute (SCNi) in 2015 began a study involving sleep education for teenagers in England and Wales. Professors Russell Foster and Colin Espie with their project "Teensleep" will assess whether ten half-hour lessons in year 10 will improve academic performance and well-being. Taught by specially trained teachers, the lessons introduce scientific theory on the importance of sleep and the effects of sleep deprivation as well as techniques for stress management.  The study has been redesigned since it was originally announced; it was previously considerably more ambitious, including a later start time at about twenty-five schools, sleep education in others, both in some schools and neither in others. Students will be evaluated before and after the sleep education periods.

Grassroots advocacy 

Community groups have sporadically arisen in various school communities since the 1990s, sometimes prompting studies and reform proposals but often dying out as concerned, active families grew out of the system. Probably the most visible and longest lasting of the grassroots advocacy groups is SLEEP in Fairfax County, Virginia, which was formed in 2004 to increase awareness of teen sleep needs and to change middle and high school start times in the Fairfax County Public Schools (FCPS) to later in the morning. More recently, social media tools have allowed once isolated advocates to unite efforts and share resources. In fall 2011, an online petition by Maryland-based science writer and education advocate Terra Ziporyn Snider effort galvanized a national non-profit organization, Start School Later, a coalition of health professionals, sleep scientists, educators, parents, students, and other concerned citizens dedicated to increasing public awareness about the relationship between sleep and school hours and to ensuring school start times compatible with health, safety, education, and equity. Active petition drives in 2012 and 2013 among the coalition's Washington DC Metro area chapters have spurred several counties to re-open their discussions and helped spearhead a study group to reconsider the issue in the Montgomery County Public Schools. Start School Later also maintains a website with links to references and other educational materials on sleep and school start times, and in 2013 partnered with The Lloyd Society to co-sponsor an educational symposium featuring keynote speaker Judith Owens, MD, MPH, Director of Sleep Medicine at the Children's National Medical Center, whose research interests include the neurobehavioral and health consequences of sleep problems in children, pharmacologic treatment of pediatric sleep disorders, and cultural and psychosocial issues that impact sleep. Many advocates also support campaigns using materials from California attorney Dennis Nolan's website, an exhaustive and frequently updated compilation of research about adolescent sleep deprivation and its relationship to early school start times. In spring 2013 the Mayo Clinic updated its online information about teen sleep to recognize grassroots efforts to start school at later times in sync with the internal clocks of adolescents.

Sleep-friendly schools and districts 
 Sudbury Valley School and other Sudbury Schools – A school model with no set hours.  Students attend 5 or 6 hours during open hours (e.g. 8:30 a.m. to 5 p.m.) depending only on the applicable laws for compulsory education. In some states in the United States, this statute is referred to as "Student Learning Time".

References 

Education reform
Education policy in the United States
Children's health
Sleep